The following is a list of programs that are currently airing, upcoming, or were formerly broadcast by Game Show Network.

Current programs

Original programs

Reruns of ended original programs

Acquired programs

Upcoming programs
Split Second (Higgins) (April 2023)

Former programs

Former original programming

Former acquired programming

References

External links
 GSN's official website

 

Game Show Network
Game Show Network